George Sewell (31 August 19242 April 2007) was an English actor, best known for his television roles, but also active on stage and in films.

Early life and career
The son of a Hoxton printer and a florist, Sewell left school at the age of 14 and worked briefly in the printing trade before switching to building work, specifically the repair of bomb-damaged houses. He then trained as a Royal Air Force pilot, though too late to see action during the Second World War.

He worked as a street photographer, assisted a French roller-skating team, and was drummer and assistant road manager of a rumba band. He also travelled Europe as a motor coach courier for a holiday company.

Acting career

Theatre
Sewell had not considered acting until, aged 35, he met the actor Dudley Sutton by chance in a pub. Sutton recommended that Sewell audition for a production by Joan Littlewood's Theatre Workshop of Fings Ain't Wot They Used T'Be. Sewell did so, and made his acting debut as a policeman in the show both at the Theatre Royal, Stratford East and in the West End. He went on to star in two other Littlewood productions, Sparrers Can't Sing (1962) and as Field Marshal Haig in Oh! What a Lovely War (1963), which later opened in Paris and on Broadway. The experience garnered from stage acting led to a long career in both film and television.

Television
For many years, Sewell was the gritty face of crime and law enforcement in a huge array of television series. Amongst his early roles, he was the tallyman in the television play Up The Junction (1965), a criminal who runs off with a teenage girl in Softly, Softly (1966), a hard-nosed building engineer in The Power Game (1965–66), a cowardly informer in Man in a Suitcase (1967), and a seedy private eye in Spindoe (1968). In 1969 he played an escaped convict called Jansen in the Randall and Hopkirk (Deceased) episode called "Vendetta for a dead man". In 1970, he played Colonel Alec Freeman in Gerry Anderson's live-action science-fiction drama UFO. Also in 1970 he played resistance leader Pierre Allard in three episodes of the ITV series Manhunt – 14 (One Way Home), 17 (The Ugly Side of War) and 22, (Intent to Steal) which were filmed in 1969 and aired in January 1970. He also appeared in a 1971 episode of Public Eye (Come into The Garden, Rose) as Harry Brierly.

In 1973, Euston Films re-invigorated the TV series Special Branch, formerly a videotaped series starring Derren Nesbitt. Sewell was brought in to play the lead character of DCI Alan Craven. The show ran for two seasons with Sewell, and served as a stylistic forerunner of crime drama The Sweeney (in which Sewell also appeared, this time as a villain). Sewell was to parody this role as Supt Frank Cottam in the Jasper Carrott/Robert Powell comedy, The Detectives.

He also played a Detective Baker who turned out to be a burglar in the Rising Damp episode The Prowler.

He also played Ray Walker in Heartbeat’’ series 9 episode 20.

Later roles
Later television appearances include Tinker Tailor Soldier Spy (1979), in which he played Mendel, and the Doctor Who story Remembrance of the Daleks (1988), in which he played builder's merchant and fascist leader Ratcliffe. He also appeared frequently in films, notably This Sporting Life (1963), Poor Cow (1967) and Get Carter (1971).

He was the subject of This Is Your Life in 1973 when he was surprised by Eamonn Andrews while filming scenes for the TV series Special Branch''.

Personal life and death
George Sewell died from cancer on 2 April 2007 at the age of 82. His brother, Danny Sewell, a former boxer, also became an actor.

Filmography

Film

Television

References

External links
 
 The Guardian obituary

1924 births
2007 deaths
20th-century English male actors
21st-century English male actors
British Merchant Navy personnel
Deaths from cancer in England
English male film actors
English male stage actors
English male television actors
Male actors from London
People educated at St Ignatius' College, Enfield
People from Hoxton
Royal Air Force pilots of World War II